M. de Dunblan is the way the first known Bishop of Dunblane is written in a copy of a papal bull of Pope Adrian IV preserved in England; the bull dates to 1155.

The papal bull was addressed to the bishops of Scotland ordering them to submit to the metropolitan authority of the Archbishop of York; the copyist made two other mistakes in the initials of bishops, so it is not totally reliable.

Cockburn speculated that M. might stand for Máel Ísu; it is very unlikely that M. was a mistake for La., standing for Laurence the successor of M. at Dunblane.

Notes

References
 Cockburn, James Hutchison, The Medieval Bishops of Dunblane and Their Church, (Edinburgh, 1959)
 Dowden, John, The Bishops of Scotland, ed. J. Maitland Thomson, (Glasgow, 1912)
 Watt, D. E. R., & Murray, A. L., Fasti Ecclesiae Scotinanae Medii Aevi ad annum 1638, Revised Edition, (Edinburgh, 2003)

12th-century deaths
12th-century Scottish Roman Catholic bishops
Bishops of Dunblane
Year of birth unknown